The University of Lagos, popularly known as UNILAG, is a public research university located in Lagos, Nigeria and was founded in 1962. UNILAG is one of the first generation universities in Nigeria and is ranked among the top universities in the world in major education publications. The university presently has three campuses in the mainland of Lagos. Whereas two of its campuses are located at Yaba (the main campus in Akoka and the recently created campus at the former school of radiography), it's college of medicine is located at Idi-Araba, Surulere. Its main campus is largely surrounded by the Lagos lagoon and has 802 acres of land. The University of Lagos currently admits over 9,000 undergraduate students annually and enrolls over 57,000 students.

A visitation panel, created to look into the affairs of the university between 2016 and 2020 detected cases of financial abuses from top officials and ordered the university to close accounts with commercial banks. On 7 October 2022, Folasade Ogunsola was appointed vice chancellor of the University of Lagos making her the first female to attain such height in the University.

History
UNILAG was founded in 1962, two years after the independence of Nigeria from Britain. It was one of the first five universities created in the country, now known as "first generation universities". Eni Njoku was appointed as the first black vice-chancellor of the university in 1962, and he remained in office till 1965 when he was replaced by Saburi Biobaku. However, due to controversy surrounding his appointment, Saburi was stabbed by Kayode Adams, a student radical who believed Biobaku's appointment was unfair and ethnically motivated.

On 29 May 2012, the then President of Nigeria, Goodluck Jonathan, proposed to rename the University of Lagos to Moshood Abiola University in honour of Moshood Abiola, who died in jail as a political prisoner in 1998. The proposed name change became a subject of protests from students and alumni. The proposal was consequently jettisoned as the Nigerian federal government gave in to the protests incited by the proposed name change.

Folasade Ogunsola is the current vice chancellor, she was appointed on 7 October 2022 and assumed office on 12 November 2022.

There has been reports of sexual misconduct levelled against several lecturers at the university which the university denied. 
In 2019, the BBC reported that "female reporters were sexually harassed, propositioned and put under pressure by senior lecturers at the institutions – all the while wearing secret cameras".
An investigative documentary was produced by former victims of the sexual harassment which was uploaded YouTube.

Academics and research

The university has remained one of the most competitive in the country in terms of admissions. With approximately 57,000 students as of 2013, the University of Lagos has one of the largest student populations of any university in the country.  The University of Lagos is one of the twenty-five federal universities which are overseen and accredited by the National Universities Commission (NUC).

A recent publication of Forbes magazine ranked the school as the third best university in Africa for entrepreneurship after University of Cape Town and Makerere University, tagging University of Lagos the "startup powerhouse" college for Nigerian students.

The university has been called "the university of first choice and the nation's pride." The university's research activity was one of the major criteria used by the National Universities Commission (NUC) in adjudging the university as the best university in Nigeria at the Nigerian University System Annual Merit Award (NUSAMA) in 2008.

The University of Lagos, College of Medicine is associated with Lagos University Teaching Hospital(LUTH). On 29 June 2020, the university received robots, CRZR, from platform capital as a donation to fight the spread of COVID-19.

Affiliate institutions and colleges 
Centre for Biodiversity Conservation and Ecosystem Management (CEBCEM) 
The centre, established in April 2018, focuses on biodiversity management, conservation and monitoring of sustainable ecosystem  through collaborative research. CEBCEM provides a platform for research and education for students of tertiary institutions as well as advocate for  environmental awareness. The Centre for Biodiversity Conservation and Ecosystem Management is the response of the University of Lagos to the threat of biodiversity in Nigeria. This response includes proposing local solutions to biodiversity conservation challenges which is facilitated through institution research grants such as  TETfund.

Administration and leadership 
The current principal members of the university administration and their positions are as follows:

Vice-Chancellors
Professor Eni Njoku: 1962–1965
Professor Saburi Biobaku: 1965–1971
Professor Jacob F. Adeniyi Ajayi: 1972–1978
Professor Babatunde Kwaku Adadevoh: 1978–1980
Professor Akinpelu Oludele Adesola: 1981–1988
Professor Nurudeen Oladapo Alao: 1988–1995
Professor Jelili Adebisi Omotola: 1995–2000
Professor Oyewusi Ibidapo Obe: Ag, 2000–2002; 2002–2007
Professor Tolu Olukayode Odugbemi: 2007–2010
Professor Babatunde Adetokunbo Sofoluwe: 2010–2012
Professor Rahmon Ade Bello: 2012–2017
Professor Oluwatoyin Ogundipe: 2017–2022
Professor Folasade Ogunsola: 2022–present

Notable alumni, faculty and staff

The university has educated many notable alumni, eminent scientists, politicians, lawyers, business icons, writers, entertainers, monarchs, countless technocrats, recipients of the Nigerian national order of merit, fellows of the various learned academies. As of September 2020, one nobel laureate and one Pulitzer prize laureate have been affiliated with University of Lagos as students, alumni, faculty, or staff.

Notable faculty 
 Wole Soyinka
 Grace Alele-Williams
 J. P. Clark
 Olufemi Majekodunmi
 Marita Golden
 Oyeleye Oyediran
 Lazarus Ekwueme
 Ken Saro Wiwa
 Solomon Babalola
 Akinsola Olusegun Faluyi
 Karen King-Aribisala

Notable alumni
Amongst the alumni of the University of Lagos, Akoka and other institutions that fall under that banner are;

Wande Abimbola, yoruba professor.
Bilikiss Adebiyi Abiola, recycler in Nigeria.
Niyi Adebayo, first executive governor of Ekiti State and current minister of industry, trade and investment.
Oladipupo Olatunde Adebutu, Nigerian politician.
Olamilekan Adegbite, minister of mines and steel development.
Wale Adenuga, publisher and film producer.
Ayo Aderinwale, Nigerian diplomat.
Kunle Adeyemi, principal of NLÉ, an architecture, design and urbanism firm, Amsterdam.
Adebayo Clement Adeyeye, Nigerian journalist and politician.
Gbenga Adeyinka, Nigerian actor, comedian,radio and TV presenter.
Ernest Afiesimama, Nigerian climate scientist.
Goddy Jedy Agba
Abisoye Ajayi-Akinfolarin, women's activist, CNN heroes top 10 awardee for 2018.
Fabian Ajogwu, lawyer and SAN.
Lola Akande, author and academic.
Omoyemi Akerele, fashion designer and founder of Style House Files.
Bola Akindele, Nigerian businesses man and philanthropist.
Funke Akindele, award-winning actress and producer.
Rilwan Akiolu, current Oba of Lagos.
Mary Akpobome, director of Heritage Banking Company Limited of Nigeria (HBCL).
Yemi Alade, award-winning musician.
Akinwunmi Ambode, former governor of Lagos State.
Abayomi Arigbabu, professor of mathematics and current commissioner of education, Ogun State.
Daré Art-Aladé, singer.
Emilia Asim-Ita, co-founder of The Future Awards Africa.
Regina Askia-Williams, nurse practitioner, actress, and former miss unilag.
Jelili Atiku, Nigerian actor.
Bolanle Austen-Peters, lawyer and businesswoman.
Adewale Ayuba, singer.
Epiphany Azinge, lawyer, senior advocate of Nigeria and former DG of Nigerian Institute of Advanced Legal Studies.

Wale Babalakin, lawyer and businessman.
Akin Babalola Kamar Odunsi, politician and businessman.
eLDee, former Nigerian-American rapper, singer and record producer.
Teju Babyface, comedian.
Tobi Bakre, actor and presenter.
Reekado Banks, singer and songwriter.
Philip Begho, writer.
Crystal Chigbu, social entrepreneur.

Stella Damasus, actress and singer.
Gbenga Daniel, former governor of Ogun State.
Raquel Kasham Daniel, author and educator
Ibrahim Hassan Dankwambo, former governor of Gombe State.
Ousainou Darboe, current Gambian minister of foreign affairs.
Fola David, medical doctor and visual artist.
Dipo Dina, Nigerian politician.

Denrele Edun, award-winning radio and television personality.
Ufuoma Ejenobor, actor and model.
Grace Ekpiwhre, former minister of science and technology.
Tony Elumelu, economist, entrepreneur and philanthropist.
Obiageli Ezekwesili, accountant and politician.
Lekan Fatodu, journalist and politician.
Kayode Fayemi, current governor of Ekiti State and former minister of solid minerals development.
Femi Gbajabiamila, lawyer, lawmaker and current speaker of Nigeria's 9th house of representatives.
Chika Ike, Nigerian actress, television personality, producer, business woman, philanthropist and former model.
IllRymz, musician, radio and television personality.
Anita Ifeoma Isede, Nigerian OAP.
Yakubu Itua,former member federal house of representative 1983 and former judge High Court of Justice, Benin-City.
Chude Jideonwo, lawyer, journalist and media entrepreneur.

Adetokunbo Kayode, Nigerian corporate lawyer, tax expert and international arbitrator, former minister of labour, minister of justice, minister of tourism, culture and national orientation.
Matilda Kerry-Osazuwa, founder of the George Kerry Life Foundation, doctor and former MBGN.
Lil Kesh, Nigerian singer, rapper and songwriter.
Laycon, rapper, singer and songwriter, winner Big Brother Naija season 5.

Kaycee Madu, Nigerian-Canadian lawyer and current minister of justice and solicitor general of Alberta.
Magixx, Nigerian singer and songwriter.
George Magoha, surgeon and academic.
Seyi Makinde, electrical engineer, businessman and current governor of Oyo State.
Toke Makinwa, award-winning radio and television personality.
Bekeme Masade-Olowola, social entrepreneur.
Mayorkun, award-winning musician.
Oliver Mbamara, lawyer and film maker.
Ufuoma McDermott, model and actress.
Lai Mohammed, lawyer and current minister of information and culture.
Ifeanyi Chudy Momah, lawyer and legislator.
John Momoh, chairman, Channels Television Group.

Genevieve Nnaji, award-winning actress, director and producer. 
Ramsey Nouah,Nigerian actor and director.
Chukwuemeka Nwajiuba, minister of state for education.

Tim Owhefere, Nigerian politician.
Uchechukwu Sampson Ogah, current Nigerian minister of state for mines and steel development.
Babatunde Ogunnaike, engineering professor. 
Ikedi Ohakim, politician and former governor of Imo state.
Bayo Ojo, SAN and former Attorney General of the Federal Republic of Nigeria.
Habeeb Okunola, businessman and philanthropist.
Wole Olanipekun, lawyer and Senior Advocate of Nigeria.
Dele Olojede, journalist, first African born winner of the Pulitzer Prize .
Simbo Olorunfemi, poet, journalist and television producer.
Ogbonnaya Onu, first executive governor of Abia State and current minister of science and technology.
Shade Omoniyi, actress
Felix Orji, bishop of the Anglican Diocese of All Nations.
Yemi Osinbajo,current vice-president, Federal Republic of Nigeria.  
Helen Ovbiagele, novelist.
Tim Owhefere, Nigerian politician.

Sasha P, rapper, musician, businesswoman, lawyer and motivational speaker.
Kemebradikumo Pondei, acting managing director of Niger Delta Development Commission.

Omowunmi Sadik, scientist and professor.
Babajide Sanwo-Olu, Nigerian politician, businessman and current governor of Lagos State.
Broda Shaggi, a comedian.
Joke Silva, award-winning actress, director and producer.
Ayo Sogunro, writer, satirist and lawyer.
Omoyele Sowore, founder, Sahara Reporters.
Gabriel Suswam, former governor of Benue State .

 Vector, Nigerian rapper and song writer.
Farida Mzamber Waziri, former chairman, EFCC.
Olajide Williams, professor of neurology at Columbia University.
Mercy Aigbe,  actress, director, fashionista and businesswoman.
Akachi Adimora-Ezeigbo, author and educator. 
Mo'Cheddah, Musical artist. 
Lekan Balogun, dramatist and theatre art director. 
Linda Ikeji, blogger.

See also
 List of universities in Nigeria
 Unilag School Fees

References

Architecture, Monuments and Vistas

 
Educational institutions established in 1962
1962 establishments in Nigeria
Public universities in Nigeria
Business schools in Lagos
Medical schools in Nigeria
Universities and colleges in Lagos

External links

University of Lagos Alumni Association official website